Hans Erik Dittmar (14 November 1902 – 20 June 1967) was a Finnish sailor and olympic medalist. He was born and died in Helsinki.

Dittmar competed at the 1924 Summer Olympics in Paris, where he received a bronze medal in the monotype class. In 1952 he was the helmsman of the Finnish boat Teresita which finished eighth in the 5.5 metre class competition.

References

External links
 

1902 births
1967 deaths
Finnish male sailors (sport)
Olympic sailors of Finland
Sailors at the 1924 Summer Olympics – Monotype
Sailors at the 1952 Summer Olympics – 5.5 Metre
Olympic bronze medalists for Finland
Olympic medalists in sailing
Medalists at the 1924 Summer Olympics
Sportspeople from Helsinki